Islam in Bulgaria is a minority religion and the second largest religion in the country after Christianity. According to the 2021 Census, the total number of Muslims in Bulgaria stood at 638,708 corresponding to 10.8% of the population. According to a 2017 estimate, Muslims make up 15% of the population. Ethnically, Muslims in Bulgaria are Turks, Bulgarians and Roma, living mainly in parts of northeastern Bulgaria (mainly in Razgrad, Targovishte, Shumen and Silistra Provinces) and in the Rhodope Mountains (mainly in Kardzhali Province and Smolyan Province).

History

The first documented Muslim contacts with Bulgaria are dated to the mid-ninth century when there were Islamic missionaries in Bulgaria, evidenced by a letter from Pope Nicholas to Boris of Bulgaria that the Saracens must be extirpated. During the time of Tsar Simeon insignificant Islamic influences on Bulgarian art began to appear, though it is believed that these can be traced to Byzantine influence. Later during the 11th and 12th centuries, nomadic Turkic tribes such as the Cumans and the Pechenegs entered Bulgaria and engaged the Byzantine Empire. According to scholars, some of these were Muslim. Migration of Muslim Seljuq Turks to Dobruja during the 13th century is also mentioned.

In 1392, the Ottoman Empire conquered the Second Bulgarian Empire. Bulgaria remained under Ottoman and Islamic rule for almost five centuries, but Christians in Bulgaria retained their culture and status, first as dhimmis and later as equals under the millet system, though until their liberation they were called giaour, meaning "infidel" as an offensive term. Muslim population in Bulgaria was a combination of indigenous converts to Islam, and Muslims originating outside the Balkans. According to scholarly consensus, conversion to Islam was voluntary as it offered Bulgarians religious and economic benefits. Missionary activities of the dervish orders resulted in mass conversions to Islam; though many converts retained Christian practices such as baptism, celebration of Christian holidays etc. Most of the urban areas became Muslim majority, whereas the rural areas remained overwhelmingly Christian.

Following the Russo-Turkish War and the 1878 Treaty of Berlin, the Danube Vilayet of the Ottoman Empire was transformed into the autonomous Principality of Bulgaria. The Muslim population of the Danube Vilayet prior to the war numbered 1,120,000. This principality was expanded after the First Balkan War when largely-Muslim Rhodope and Western Thrace regions were incorporated into the country's territory. This process was accompanied by forced Christianization of Muslim Pomak settlements. These events changed the ethnic and religious makeup of Bulgaria.

Like the practitioners of other beliefs including Orthodox Christians, Muslims suffered under the restriction of religious freedom by the Marxist-Leninist Zhivkov regime which instituted state atheism and suppressed religious communities. The Bulgarian communist regimes declared Islam and other religions to be "opium of the people." In 1989, 310,000 to 360,000 people fled to Turkey as a result of the communist Zhivkov regime's assimilation campaign. That program, which began in 1984, forced all Turks and other Muslims in Bulgaria to adopt Bulgarian names and renounce all Muslim customs. The motivation of the 1984 assimilation campaign was unclear; however, many experts believed that the disproportion between the birth rates of the Turks and the Bulgarians was a major factor. The event became known as "the revival process" or "the renaming." Bulgarian historian Antonina Zhelyazkova estimated that, during the period of 1990–1996, almost 400,000 more people from Bulgaria emigrated to Turkey in a second "revival process."

Muslims in Bulgaria enjoyed greater religious freedom after the fall of the Zhivkov regime. New mosques were built in many cities and villages; one village built a new church and a new mosque side by side. Some villages organized Quran study courses for young people (study of the Quran had been completely forbidden under Zhivkov). Muslims also began publishing their own newspaper, Miusiulmani, in both Bulgarian and Turkish.

Demographics
According to the 2011 census, there were 577,139 Muslims in Bulgaria, making up 7.8% of the country. According to more recent 2014 estimates, almost one million Muslims live in Bulgaria, forming the largest Muslim minority in any EU country (percentage-wise, not in absolute numbers). According to a 2017 survey by the Pew Research Center, 15% of Bulgaria's population is Muslim. Almost all Muslims in Bulgaria are Bulgarian citizens.

Geographical distribution 

According to the 2001 census, 43 municipalities out of 262 have a Muslim majority. There were five municipalities with a Muslim population over 90 percent: Chernoochene (96.8 percent) has the highest share of Muslims, followed by Venets (95.9 percent), Satovcha (91.3 percent), Ruen (90.9 percent) and Kaolinovo (90.0 percent). Other municipalities with a mainly Muslim population are: Ardino, Momchilgrad, Borino, Hitrino, Samuil, Rudozem, Kirkovo, Dzhebel, Madan, Krumovgrad, Yakoruda, Dulovo, Omurtag, Belitsa, Varbitsa, Garmen, Loznitza, Opaka, Stambolovo, Glavinitsa, Zavet, Kaynardzha, Nikola Kozlevo, Isperih, Tsar Kaloyan, Vetovo, Antonovo, Kubrat, Kardzhali, Tervel and Mineralni Bani.

Demographic indicators
Muslims in Bulgaria have slightly better demographic indicators compared to the Orthodox Christians in Bulgaria. The reason for this difference is mostly because of ethnicity: most Muslims in Bulgaria are Turks and Roma (and to a much lesser extent ethnic Bulgarians) and those ethnic groups live mainly in rural areas; they have different reproductive traditions and they have a younger age structure compared to the ethnic Bulgarians which leads to higher fertility and birth rates. In provinces with large Muslim concentrations, birth rates are a little bit higher while death rates are lower than the country average. For example: Bulgaria had a total birth rate of 10.5‰ in 1992 while Muslims formed about 13 percent of the total population. However, in provinces with large Muslim populations the birth rate ranged from in 11.0‰ in Smolyan and 11.6‰ in Silistra to 13.1‰ in Razgrad (>50 percent Muslim) and 14.7‰ in Kardzhali (about 70 percent Muslim).

Age structure

Muslims constituted about 10 percent of all respondents in the 2011 census, but they formed around 12 percent of all respondents aged under thirty and less than 7 percent of all respondents aged seventy or more.

Ethnicity 

According to the 2011 census, the largest ethnic group of Muslims in Bulgaria are Turks (444,434 people), followed by ethnic Bulgarians (67,350), and ethnic Roma (42,201).

Almost 64% of Muslims in Bulgaria that are ethnically Turks live in Kardzhali, Razgrad, Targovishte, Shumen, Silistra, Dobrich Ruse, and Burgas. They live mostly in rural settlements.

Muslims in Bulgaria that are ethnically Roma mainly live in Shumen, Sliven, Dobrich, Targovishte, Pazardzhik and Silistra.

Pomak Muslims mainly live around the Rhodope Mountains, especially in the province Smolyan and the municipalities of Satovcha, Yakoruda, Belitsa, Garmen, Gotse Delchev, Ardino, Krumovgrad, Kirkovo and Velingrad. A large part of the population in those areas did not respond to the census questions which makes it difficult to calculate the exact number of Pomaks. In the municipality of Dospat for example, only 4746 people out of 9116 answered the question on their religion and in the municipality of Satovcha only 9562 out of 15444 people did so. Pomaks live mostly in rural areas and their fertility rates are among the lowest in Bulgaria.

Tatar Muslims live in northeastern Bulgaria and the small Arab diaspora is based mainly in the capital, Sofia.

According to a December 2011 New Bulgarian University survey of Muslims in Bulgaria, roughly 64% identified as Turks, 10.1% identified as Pomaks, and 7.0% identified as Roma.

Branches

According to the 2011 Bulgarian census 94.6% of Muslims in Bulgaria were Sunni Muslim, 4.75% were Shia, and 0.65% were Muslims without further specifications. There is also a small Ahmadiyya presence in Bulgaria, but they are not counted on the census.

Religiosity

Evgenia Ivanova of the New Bulgarian University stated in 2011 that "religion is not of primary importance to Bulgaria's Muslims." The New Bulgarian University conducted a survey of 1.850 Muslims in Bulgaria, which found that 48.6% described themselves as religious, 28.5% of which were very religious. Approximately 41% never went to a mosque and 59.3% did not pray at home. Only 0.5% believed that disputes should be resolved using Islamic Sharia law and 79.6% said that wearing a veil in school was "unacceptable." 50,4% of the respondents said cohabitation without marriage was "acceptable" (41,9% said "nonacceptable" and 7,6% refused to answer), 39.8% ate pork and 43.3% drank alcohol. On the contrary, 88% of respondents said they circumcised their boys and 96% observed Muslim burial practices for their relatives.

According to a 2017 Pew Research Center survey, 33% of Bulgarian Muslims responded that religion is "very important" in their lives. The same survey found that 7% of Bulgarian Muslims pray all five salah, 22% attend mosque at least once a week, and 6% read Quran at least once a week.

Culture
During the socialist period of Bulgaria's history, most Muslims did not have access to halal food. In contemporary Bulgaria, the notion of halal food is only slowly re-appearing and only a few Muslims adhere to dietary restrictions. The majority of Muslims in Bulgaria who adhere to halal food restrictions are recent Arab immigrants to the country. In supermarkets, there are no signs indicating whether food is halal.

Few Bulgarian Muslim women wear traditional Islamic dress of any kind, such as headscarves, and most who do live in the rural parts of the country.

On 20 February 2013, the regional muftiate in Shumen organized a Sufi music concert, announced to be the first of its kind, because of the participation of a unique male choir consisting of 22 Sufi singers trained in Todor Ikonomovo village. The event was honoured by the Chief Mufti, the Head of the Supreme Muslim Council Shabanali Ahmed, diplomats from the Turkish Embassy in Sofia and other distinguished guests.

In 2013, the council of Ministers granted a day's holiday for Mawlid, two days for Eid al-Fitr, and three for Eid al-Adha. During Eid al-Adha, 2,500 packages of meat were distributed to people in need by the Chief Muftiate. The same year, the Chief Muftiate organized campaigns to help provide food and shelter to Syrian refugees.

In October 2014, the Muftiate launched a campaign during Eid al-Adha to donate packages of meat 30,000 families of any religion.

During Ashura, the Muftiate and representatives of the Bulgarian Orthodox Church distributed thousands of portions of Ashure for the poor.

Interfaith relations
Since 1989, the Muftiate has made effort to expand interreligious relations between Muslims and religious groups in Bulgaria. In 2013, Muslims helped in the repair of a church in Dyranovets. Teachers and pupils from Muslim religious schools meet with their Christian counterparts.

According to Bulgarian scholar and writer Aziz Nazmi Shakir, the relations between the local Muslim and Jewish communities are "rather positive." In August 2013, during Limmud week, the Bulgarian Jewish community organized in Bansko a scientific discussion dedicated to "The Personality of Moses in the Discourses of the Monotheistic Religions" attended by the Deputy Chief Mufti Miimiin Birali, Rabbi Aaron Zerbib, Pastor Evgeniy Naydenov and Father Petko Valov, the representative of the Catholic Apostolic Exarchate.

In 2013, during Ramadan, United States Ambassador Marcie Ries organized an iftar to which the Chief Mufti Mustafa Alish, the head of the Central Israelite Spiritual Council Robert Jerassy and the president of the United Evangelical Churches Nikolay Nedelev were invited. On 23 May and 8 June 2013, Christian and Muslim women held a charity bazaar (selling prayer beads, clothing, accessories, paintings, etc.) in the square behind Banya Bashi Mosque aimed at providing financial support for the Centre for Medical Care and "St. Ivan Rilski" Nursery in Sofia. In recent years, the Students' Council at the Higher Islamic Institute and the Chief Muftiate, in cooperation with Central Israelite Spiritual Council, the Theological Faculty at Sofia University "St Kliment Ohridski", the organisation of the Jews in Bulgaria "Shalom" and "Ethnopalitra" Foundation have organized interreligious discussions and public lectures dedicated to the philosophical, historical and political relations between the monotheistic religions, hosted by the Media Cultural Centre of the Chief Muftiate. The Chief Mufti met with the Neophyte of Bulgaria and Anselmo Guido Pecorari in 2014.

Education and income

During the transition to capitalism after the 1990 fall of socialist government, Muslim communities suffered disproportionately. Numerous Muslim enterprises were shut down and the low economic status of Muslims was exacerbated by the lack of education and poor infrastructure in the rural parts of the country. A 2001 study by sociologists under the leadership of Ivan Szelenyi from Yale University concluded that poverty and severe economic crisis affected Muslims and Roma in Bulgaria the most. Sociologists have since used the term "ethnicization" to describe the widening of the economic status gap negatively affecting several minority communities in Bulgaria. Research also shows that educational problems faced by minorities creates social stratification and magnifies negative stereotypes.

Religious infrastructure
Muslims are represented in the public arena by the Chief Muftiate. In 2013, the Provisional Prime Minister Marin Raykov visited the Muftiate. During his visit, Raykov stated that Muslims were an integral part of the nation and promised "the wounds of the past will not be exploited." Officially, the Bulgarian Muslim community is called the Мюсюлманско изповедание (Muslim Denomination). Administration is controlled by the Висш духовен съвет (Supreme Muslim Council), which has 30 members. The core institution, of the Supreme Muslim Council is the Главно мюфтийство (Chief Muftiate), which has 20 departments including Hajj, education, and public relations. There are also 21 regional muftiates. The current Chief Mufti of Bulgaria is Mustafa Hadzhi, who was reelected in 2016.

Ekrem Hakki Ayverdi documented 2,356 mosques in Bulgaria during the 1980s. Currently, the number of mosques in Bulgaria is estimated to be around 1,260. Around 400 of these mosques were constructed after the fall of the communist government, and more than 100 are not currently in use. During the communist era, the estate property acts of most mosques were purged from the archives. The largest mosque in Bulgaria is the Tumbul Mosque in Shumen, built during the 18th century.

The Scientific Research Centre (SRC) at the Higher Islamic Institute was established in 2014. The SRC aims to promote constructive and critical study of Islam and Muslims, especially in Europe. Particular areas of research include classical and modern exegesis methods, ecology and Islam, and Islamic art.

Controversy

Islamic dress
On 30 September 2016, the Parliament of Bulgaria, backed by the Patriotic Front passed the law that outlaws wearing burqas by women in public places in an effort to combat terrorism and migrants flowing through Europe. However, non-Bulgarian citizens are free to wear the burqa.

Islamism
In 2012, 13 Salafi imams were put on trial in the Pazardzhik District Court for "preaching anti-democratic ideology" and "opposition to the principles of democracy, separation of powers, liberalism, a rule-of-law state, basic human rights such as gender equality and religious freedom." In March 2014, one of the imams named Ahmed Musa Ahmed, was found guilty and sentenced to one year in prison. Two other imams were given suspended prison sentences and the other ten were fined. In 2015, the case was brought to an appellate court.

In November 2014, several homes were raided in the Roma village of Izgrev of the Pazardzhik Province in southern Bulgaria. Among the 26 people who were arrested for 24 hours was Ahmed Musa Ahmed and six other preachers who were charged with support ISIS. Deputy Chief Prosecutor Borislav Sarafov stated that the preachers were propagating anti-democratic ideology and "non-native… 'Arab' forms of Islam" opposed to the "Turkish Islam" that has existed in Bulgaria for centuries.

Multiple studies, including work by IMIR, have concluded that Salafi and Islamist ideology disproportionately affect the Roma Muslim community due to the community's low economic and educational standing compared to mainstream Bulgarian society.

Opposition
In October 2014, the Chief Muftiate published a declaration condemning ISIS and appealing to Bulgarian Muslims not to respond to calls for jihad and the establishment of a caliphate.

Discrimination
Muslims in Bulgaria are obliged to register periodic conferences at the Sofia City Court, which members of the Bulgarian Orthodox Church are not required to do.

The Attack Party, IMRO – Bulgarian National Movement, and other far-right factions have used refugees to ignite xenophobia, and at least three racially motivated attacks were reported in 2013. After an Attack MP warned the country that Syrian refugees were "cannibals" and that their presence was designed to disguise an "Islamic wave" supported by American and Turkish interests, a group of Syrian refugees filed a complaint before the State Commission for Discrimination. In November 2013, a new nationalistic party was founded promising to "cleanse the country of foreign immigrant scum." Ultranationalist factions have formed "citizen patrols" to check whether migrants "comply with the law of the state". Some of these claimed to have official authorization from the authorities.

In February 2014, 19 MP's of the Attack Party and the Religious Denominations and Parliamentary Ethics Committee prepared a bill amending the Laws on Religions that would stop lawsuits for regaining waqf properties claimed by the Muftiate. In February 2014, more than 1,000 people from across Bulgaria protested against the decision of the Plovdiv Court to return the Kurshun Mosque in Karlovo, which had been nationalized during the communist era. The same month, protesters threw stones and smoke bombs at the Jumaya Mosque in Plovdiv. They waved signs holding "Stop the Islamization of Bulgaria." Similar protests were supported by the National Front for the Salvation of Bulgaria. In July 2014, for the first time in Bulgaria's democratic history, the President of Bulgaria Rosen Plevneliev hosted an iftar dinner. The iftar took place in the President's Boyana Residence and was attended by the Prime Minister, the Speaker of the National Assembly, party leaders, and representatives of all religions in the country.

Notable Bulgarian Muslims
Ahmed Dogan, politician
Lyutvi Mestan, politician
Mustafa Karadaya, politician
Tsvetan Teofanov, translator of the Quran into Bulgarian

See also
Islam by country
Bulgarian Muslims
Pomaks
Alians
Turks in Bulgaria
Crimean Tatars in Bulgaria
List of mosques in Bulgaria

References

Sources

Further reading

Kristen R. Ghodsee, Muslim Lives in Eastern Europe: Gender, Ethnicity and the Transformation of Islam in Postsocialist Bulgaria, Princeton University Press, 2009.